In the modern world, there are a number of nursing specialities.

Professional organizations or certifying boards issue voluntary certification in many of these specialties.

Advanced practice nursing
Aesthetic nursing/cosmetic nursing
Ambulatory care nursing
Burn nursing
Camp nursing
Cardiac nursing
Cardiac Intervention nursing
Diabetes Nursing
Dental nursing
Medical case management
Community health nursing
Correctional nursing
Critical care nursing
Emergency nursing
Environmental health nursing
Faith community nursing
Flight nursing
Forensic nursing
Gastroenterology nursing
Genetics nursing
Geriatric nursing
Haematology nursing
Health visiting
Holistic nursing
Home health nursing
Hospice and palliative care nursing
Hyperbaric nursing
Immunology and allergy nursing
Intravenous therapy nursing
Infection control nursing
Infectious disease nursing
Legal nurse consultant
Maternal-child nursing
Medical-surgical nursing
Military and uniformed services nursing
Neonatal nursing
Neurosurgical nursing
Nephrology nursing
Nurse attorney
Nursing informatics
Nursing management
Nursing research
Nurse midwifery
Obstetrical nursing
Occupational health nursing
Oncology nursing
Orthopaedic nursing
Ostomy nursing
Pediatric nursing
Perianesthesia nursing
Perioperative nursing
Psychiatric nursing
Private duty nursing
Public health nursing
Pulmonary nursing
Quality improvement
Radiology nursing
Rehabilitation nursing
Research nursing
Renal nursing
School nursing
Space nursing
Sub-acute nursing
Substance abuse nursing
Surgical nursing
Telenursing
Telephone triage nursing
Transplantation nursing
Travel nursing
Urology nursing
Utilization management
Vascular Access
Wound care

See also

List of nursing credentials

References

 
Nur